P. J. Gillic (born 20 May 1967) is an Irish former sportsperson. He played Gaelic football for his local club Carnaross and was a senior member of the Meath county team in the 1980s and 1990s.
He won two National League titles in 1988 and 1990 and two All-Ireland titles in 1987 and 1988 with Meath.

References

1967 births
Living people
Meath inter-county Gaelic footballers
Winners of two All-Ireland medals (Gaelic football)